Maurice and Thelma Rothman House is a national historic site located at 1018 Park Street North, St. Petersburg, Florida in Pinellas County. It is an example of Mid-century modern architecture designed by the St. Petersburg architect Martin P. Fishback, Jr.

It was added to the National Register of Historic Places on February 27, 2013.

References

National Register of Historic Places in Pinellas County, Florida
Houses in St. Petersburg, Florida